PVDA, PvdA, or PVdA may refer to:
For Aosta Valley, a former political party in the Aosta Valley region of Italy (Pour la Vallée d'Aoste), usually written PVdA
Labour Party (Netherlands), a Dutch political party (Partij van de Arbeid), usually written PvdA
Workers' Party of Belgium, a Belgian political party (Partij van de Arbeid van België), usually written PVDA